Hydrogenophaga palleronii is a bacterium from the Comamonadaceae family, which has the ability to degrade 4-aminobenzenesulfonate.

References

External links 

Type strain of Hydrogenophaga palleronii at BacDive -  the Bacterial Diversity Metadatabase

Comamonadaceae
Bacteria described in 1989